George S. Hodson (June 1868 – January 9, 1924) was a pitcher in Major League Baseball. He played for the Boston Beaneaters in 1894 and the Philadelphia Phillies in 1895. He also pitched in the minor leagues for 17 seasons and won 20 or more games six times. Hodson was 5 feet, 7 inches tall and weighed 150 pounds.

Career
Hodson was born in Pennsylvania in 1868. He started his professional baseball career in 1888 with the International Association's Buffalo Bisons. Over the next several seasons, he bounced around the minor leagues. He had a win–loss record of 11-9 while playing in the Eastern Interstate League in 1890. In 1892, he had a big season for the Altoona Mountaineers of the Pennsylvania State League, going 21-12 with a 1.33 earned run average; he led the league in wins, complete games (32), innings pitched (319), walks (98), and strikeouts (223).

Hodson stayed in the Pennsylvania State League for a few years until he was purchased by the National League's Boston Beaneaters in August 1894. He made 11 late-season starts for Boston, going 4-4 with a 5.84 ERA. Early in the following season, he went 1-2 with a 9.53 ERA for the Philadelphia Phillies; that was his last major league experience. He finished the season pitching for the Eastern League's Providence Grays and would stay with the club until 1898. In 1895, he won 20 games for them, and in 1897, he won 21. Playing for the Connecticut State League's New Haven Blues in 1900, Hodson had another good campaign and led the league in wins (22), complete games (32), and innings pitched (315).

After 1900, Hodson moved west and pitched two seasons for Oakland of the California League. He won 13 games in 1901 and then won 23 games in 1902 to help Oakland capture the league championship. In 1903, he played for the San Francisco Seals of the new Pacific Coast League. He won the franchise's first-ever game on March 26. Hodson pitched 399.2 innings that year in 50 appearances, and he went 20-24 with a 3.42 ERA. He then spent one season in the Western League before retiring from baseball.

Hodson died in San Rafael, California, in 1924.

References

External links

1868 births
1924 deaths
Major League Baseball pitchers
Boston Beaneaters players
Philadelphia Phillies players
19th-century baseball players
Baseball players from Pennsylvania
Buffalo Bisons (minor league) players
Dover (minor league baseball) players
York (minor league baseball) players
Altoona Mountaineers players
Jamestown (minor league baseball) players
Altoona Mud Turtles players
Harrisburg Senators players
Troy Washerwomen players
Scranton Indians players
Shenandoah Huns players
Providence Grays (minor league) players
Providence Clamdiggers (baseball) players
Utica Pent Ups players
Scranton Miners players
Hartford Indians players
Wooden Nutmegs players
New Haven Blues players
Oakland Commuters players
Oakland Clamdiggers players
San Francisco Seals (baseball) players
St. Joseph Saints players
Sportspeople from San Rafael, California